Elizabeth Atkinson Rash Brown (born February 16, 1932) is a professor emerita of history at Brooklyn College, of the City University of New York, a scholar and published author, known for her writings on feudalism. She received her B.A. from Swarthmore College and A.M. and PhD. from Radcliffe College and Harvard University. In 2009 Elizabeth A. R. Brown was elected the Second Vice-President of the Medieval Academy of America and in 2010-2011 served as its president.

With her groundbreaking articleThe Tyranny of a Construct: Feudalism and Historians of Medieval Europe (1974) Brown initiated an ongoing inconclusive discussion as to whether use of the term feudalism is a useful construct for understanding medieval society. In her critique, Brown highlights the potential for constructs to influence research agendas and warns constructs that we use to analyze the past can be exclusive.

Works

Monographs
Customary Aids And Royal Finance in Capetian France: The Marriage Aid of Philip the Fair; (Hardcover, Medieval Academy of Amer)
 (0-915651-00-9)
"Franks, Burgundians, and Aquitanians" and the Royal Coronation Ceremony in France; (Diane Pub Co.)
 (0-87169-827-7)
Jean Du Tillet and the French Wars of Religion: Five Tracts, 1562-1569; (Hardcover, Mrts)
 (0-86698-155-1)The Monarchy of Capetian France and Royal Ceremonial; (Hardcover, Variorum)
 (0-86078-279-4)Oxford Collection of the Drawings of Roger De Gaigni'Eres and the Royal Tombs of Saint-Denis; (Diane Pub. Co.
 (0-87169-785-8)Politics & Institutions in Capetian France; (Ashgate Pub. Co.)
 (0-86078-298-0)

Articles
"Taxation and Morality in the Thirteenth and Fourteenth Centuries: Conscience and Political Power and the Kings of France," French Historical Studies, Vol. 8, No. 1 (Spring, 1973), pp. 1-28.
"The Tyranny of a Construct: Feudalism and Historians of Medieval Europe," The American Historical Review, Vol. 79, No. 4 (Oct., 1974), pp. 1063-1088, at 1075-1076.
"The Ceremonial of Royal Succession in Capetian France: The Funeral of Philip V," Speculum, Vol. 55, No. 2 (Apr., 1980), pp. 266-293.
"The Political Repercussions of Family Ties in the Early Fourteenth Century: The Marriage of Edward II of England and Isabelle of France," Speculum, Vol. 63, No. 3 (Jul., 1988), pp. 573-595.
"Authority, the Family, and the Dead in Late Medieval France," French Historical Studies, Vol. 16, No. 4 (Autumn, 1990), pp. 803-832.
"Philip V, Charles IV, and the Jews of France: The Alleged Expulsion of 1322," Speculum'', Vol. 66, No. 2 (Apr., 1991), pp. 294–329.

References

1932 births
Living people
American medievalists
Women medievalists
Radcliffe College alumni
20th-century American women writers
20th-century American non-fiction writers
Swarthmore College alumni
Fellows of the Medieval Academy of America
American women historians
Brooklyn College faculty
21st-century American women